Qais Khedri (born January 3, 1980) is an Afghan football player. He has played for Afghanistan national team.

National team statistics

External links

1980 births
Living people
Afghan footballers
Association football defenders
Afghanistan international footballers